Boomerang is a Turkish-language children's television channel broadcasting to Turkey.

History 

On 13 April 2016, Turner Broadcasting System Europe announced the launch of Boomerang in Turkey on 23 April 2016, which is Turkey's National Children's Day. The HD channel was launched exclusively on the Tivibu and D-Smart operators in Turkey.

See also 

 Cartoonito (brand as a whole)
 List of international Cartoon Network channels
 List of programs broadcast by Boomerang
 List of programs broadcast by Cartoonito

References

External links 

 

Cartoonito
Boomerang (TV network)
Children's television networks
Television channels and stations established in 2016

Television stations in Turkey
Turkish-language television stations
Turner Broadcasting System Europe
Warner Bros. Discovery EMEA